Vřesovice may refer to places in the Czech Republic:

Vřesovice (Hodonín District), a municipality and village in the South Bohemian Region
Vřesovice (Prostějov District), a municipality and village in the Olomouc Region